Carla's Dreams is a music project from Moldova, formed in 2012 in Chișinău. The band is composed of an anonymous group of singers and composers who perform their songs in Romanian, English and Russian. Their lead singer, codenamed Sergiu, and his bandmates all hide their identity in public appearances by wearing hooded sweatshirts, sunglasses and a face mask made of makeup. Carla's Dreams rose to prominence in Moldova and Romania upon releasing the single "P.O.H.U.I." with Inna in 2013, and have since then issued nine singles that went on to be number-one singles in Romania.

Career

Carla's Dreams started its activity in Moldova; their name is inspired by the character Karla from the espionage novels of the British-Irish writer John le Carré. They released the album Hobson's Choice online for free on 4 May 2012. In 2013, they collaborated with Inna on "P.O.H.U.I.", which went on to reach number three on Romania's national Airplay 100 chart. Three consecutive number-one singles on the chart—"Cum ne noi"("How We Us") featuring Delia, "Te rog" ("Please") and "Sub pielea mea" ("Under My Skin")—were included alongside "P.O.H.U.I." on the band's first major-label record Ngoc (2016). The latter single also experienced success in other territories such as Russia, Poland and France. In 2016, Carla's Dreams composed and performed the song on the soundtrack of the comedy TV series Atletico Textila, broadcast by Pro TV. In May 2016, the band released the album NGOC. The band also won eight awards at the Media Music Awards in 2016, and released their second studio album Antiexemplu (Antiexample), which included hits such as "Acele" ("The Needles") and "Imperfect".

From 2016 until 2018, Carla's Dreams' lead singer was a member of the jury of X-Factor, with him yielding the sixth season's winner Olga Verbițchi. In May 2018, the band held their concert Monomaniac at the Roman Arenas, and their lead singer became a juror on the show The Four. Another notable performance followed in the September of the same year, at the 18th edition of the Golden Stag Festival in Brașov. In October 2018, the band started their Nocturn (Nocturne) project, consisting of a series of videos directed by Roman Burlacă with links between them, all filmed during the night. Among the singles that benefited from a music video was the number-one hit "Luna" ("The Moon"). In 2021, Carla's Dreams released another number-one single in Romania, "N-aud" ("I'm Not Hearing") with Emaa. Furthermore, the song "Simplu și ușor" ("Simple and Easy") won the award for best song of the year at the Artist Awards 2021. In September 2021, the band's lead singer became a juror on Pro TV's music show SuperStar România. He also had a surprise appearance on the show Masked Singer România, where he competed as an emoji.

Discography

Studio albums

Singles

As lead artist

As featured artist

Promotional singles

Awards and nominations

Songwriting credits

Notes

External links 

 Official website

References

2012 establishments in Moldova
Global Records artists
Masked musicians
Moldovan musical groups